John Yates (18 November 1929 – 2 September 2020) was an English footballer, who played as a winger in the Football League for Chester.

He moved to Canada in 1974 and became involved with the Salvation Army often acting as a musical conductor to their bands. Yates died on 2 September 2020, at the age of 90.

References

External links

1929 births
2020 deaths
Association football wingers
Chester City F.C. players
English Football League players
English footballers
Footballers from Rotherham
Sheffield United F.C. players